Temporal gyrus may refer to
the inferior temporal gyrus
the middle temporal gyrus
the superior temporal gyrus
the transverse temporal gyrus